Rebecca Gayle Howell (born August 10, 1975, in Lexington, Kentucky) is an American writer, literary translator, and editor. In 2019 she was named a United States Artists Fellow.

Education
Howell was born to a working-class family in Lexington, Kentucky on August 10, 1975. She earned her BA and her MA at the University of Kentucky, her MFA at Drew University, and her PhD at Texas Tech University, where she studied under Curtis Bauer. Howell also apprenticed under the Southern experimental art photographer and writer James Baker Hall, as well as the leading Jewish feminist poet, Alicia Ostriker. Other mentors include Carolyn Forché, Nikky Finney, Gerald Stern, Wendell Berry, W.S. Merwin, and Jean Valentine.

Career

Poetry 
Her first book Render / An Apocalypse was selected by Nick Flynn for the Cleveland State University Poetry Center's First Book Prize (2013). Render / An Apocalypse also received a cover review in The Los Angeles Times, The Nautilus Award, and a finalist shortlist for Foreword Review's INDIES Book of the Year.  In 2016, Burnaway: Art of the South named it a Best Book of the Year. In 2020 literary critic Jennifer Ashton featured Render / An Apocalypse in her chapter "Ecology, Ethics, and the Apocalyptic Lyric in Recent American Poetry" for Apocalypse in American Literature and Culture (Cambridge University Press).

American Purgatory, her second book, was selected by Don Share for The Sexton Prize and was published in both Great Britain and the United States in 2017. American Purgatory was also a finalist for Foreword Review's INDIES Book of the Year. The book was named a must read by The Courier-Journal,The Millions and Poetry London. Other reviewers included ArtsATL, Nashville Review, The Arkansas Democrat-Gazette, and The Rumpus.

In March 2023, Howell released What Things Cost: an anthology for the people, which she co-edited Ashley M. Jones and associate editor Emily Jalloul (University Press of Kentucky). The collection has received a starred review from Publisher's Weekly, a notable anthology for 2023 by Poetry & Writers, and a best Southern book of 2023 by Southern Review of Books. What Things Cost is called by the publisher, "the first major anthology of labor writing in nearly a century," and all proceeds go to benefit The Poor People's Campaign.

Translation 
Howell is the English-language translator of Amal al-Jubouri's verse memoir of the Iraq War, Hagar Before the Occupation /  Hagar After the Occupation (Alice James Books, 2011). This translation, carried out in collaboration with Husam Qaisi and al-Jubouri, was a finalist for the 2012 Best Translated Book Award and the U.K.'s Banipal Prize for Arabic Literary Translation. International reviewers included The Wall Street Journal's Mint and Asymptote. Hagar received a Best Book of Poetry for 2011 from Library Journal and a Best Book by an Arab Woman from Book Riot in 2017.

Howell's English-language version of Claudia Prado's The belly of the whale / El Interior de la ballena (Editorial Nusud, 2000) will be released in 2024 by Texas Tech University Press. El interior de la ballena is a collection of Patagonian agrarian poetry. It received the bronze Concurso Régimen de Fomento a la Producción Literaria Nacional y Estímulo a la Industria Editorial del Fondo nacional de las Artes. Howell's and Prado's versions have appeared in The Sewanee Review, Waxwing, The Common and elsewhere.

Librettos 
In 2019, she began a collaboration with classical composer Reena Esmail. A Winter Breviary, their solstice carol cycle, was published by Oxford University Press in 2022. The third of these carols, "The Unexpected Early Hour," was premiered at the Los Angeles Master Chorale Festival of Carols, December 4, 2021, then recorded and broadcast by the BBC on December 24, 2021. In 2022, The Gesualdo Six recorded the entire cycle for Choral Music from Oxford with the Gesualdo Six. The work was performed and toured by choirs like The Gesualdo Six, The Sixteen, and Voces8 during the 2022 holiday performance season.

Publishing 
Rebecca Gayle Howell is the Poetry Editor of Oxford American. In this role, she works to create a new profile of Southern poetics. She is also known for commissioning longer poetic works. Since 2014, Howell has published writing by poets like Nathaniel Mackey, Nikki Giovanni, Tarfia Faizullah, Tyehimba Jess, C.D. Wright, Kwame Dawes, Ashley M. Jones, Ada Limón, Dean Young, Crystal Wilkinson, Naomi Shihab Nye, and Jericho Brown. In 2016, Howell and her fellow editors received the National Magazine Award for General Excellence, marking the first time in the magazine's 24-year history to receive the award.

Howell is also an Assistant Editor and Letterpress Printer for Q Avenue Books, and a Contributing Editor for Pushcart Press. In 2015 she began freelance editing place-based poetry collections, including Crystal Wilkinson's Perfect Black (University Press of Kentucky, 2021); Julia Bouwsma's Work By Bloodlight (Cider Press, 2017); Nomi Stone's Kill Class (Tupelo Press, 2019); and Savannah Sipple's WWJD And Other Poems (Sibling Rivalry Press, 2019). In 2017, she founded Fireside Industries, an imprint of the University Press of Kentucky. Among the titles Howell published with Fireside are first books by Tanya Berry and Annette Saunooke Clapsaddle.

Awards 
2019 United States Artists Fellow.
2017 Foreword Reviews Indies Award. Finalist. For American Purgatory (Black Springs Press Group, 2017).
2016 The Sexton Prize. Selected by Don Share. For American Purgatory (Black Springs Press Group, 2017). 
2016 Al Smith Individual Artist Fellowship, Kentucky Arts Council.
2016 National Magazine Award for General Excellence, shared with the editors of The Oxford American.  
2014 Pushcart Prize. XXXIX. Best of the Small Presses. Edited by Bill Henderson. 
2014 Poetry Fellow, 2nd year. Selected by C.D. Wright. Fine Arts Work Center. Provincetown, MA.
2013 Nautilus Book Award, Silver. For Render /An Apocalypse (Cleveland State University Poetry Center, 2013)
2013 Foreword Reviews Indies Award. Finalist. For Render /An Apocalypse (Cleveland State University Poetry Center, 2013) 
2012 Cleveland State University Poetry Center First Book Prize. Selected by Nick Flynn. For Render /An Apocalypse (Cleveland State University Poetry Center, 2013).
2012 Best Translated Book Award.Three Percent. Finalist. For Hagar Before the Occupation / Hagar After the Occupation (Alice James Books, 2011).
2012 Banipal Prize for Arabic Literary Translation. Finalist. For Hagar Before the Occupation / Hagar After the Occupation (Alice James Books, 2011).
2010 Poetry Fellow. Fine Arts Work Center. Provincetown, MA.

Books 
What Things Cost: an anthology for the people, co-edited by Rebecca Gayle Howell & Ashley M. Jones. Associate Editor, Emily Jalloul. (University Press of Kentucky, 2023).
A Winter Breviary, written by Rebecca Gayle Howell, composed by Reena Esmail. (Oxford University Press, 2022).
American Purgatory, poems by Rebecca Gayle Howell. (Black Spring Press Group, 2017).
Render / An Apocalypse, poems by Rebecca Gayle Howell. (Cleveland State University Poetry Center, 2013). 
Hagar Before the Occupation / Hagar After the Occupation, poems by Amal al-Jubouri and translated by Rebecca Gayle Howell with Husam Qaisi. (Alice James Books, 2011).

References

External links 
Interviewer: storySouth
Interviewer: WMFA.
Reviewer: Poetry London
Reviewer: Arts Atlanta
Reviewer: Los Angeles Times 
Reviewer: The Rumpus
Smith College Poetry Center > Rebecca Gayle Howell bio
	Interview: Out of Our Minds with J.P. Dancing Bear.
 

1975 births
Living people
21st-century American poets
American women poets
21st-century American translators
21st-century American women writers